Malarky is a trivia game that incorporates bluffing into the gameplay.  It was developed by Rocco "Ernie" Capobianco, a Dallas advertising executive, and David Feldman, the maker of the Imponderables novels, and published by Patch Products in 1997.

Awards

Awards won by this bluffing game/board game include:
Number 1 Game of the Year (Good Housekeeping, September 1997)
Buyer's Guide to Games (Games Magazine, 1998)
Zillions Magazine, Consumer Reports for Kids (March/April 1998)
National Association for Gifted Children Holiday Educational Toy List (1998)
The FamilyFun Kid Test Toy of the Year Award Finalist (1998)
LifeWorks' Real Life Award (1999)

References

External links
 
 Patch Products: Malarky

Party board games